Putukwam (Utugwang-Irungene-Afrike) is a Bendi language of Obudu LGA, Cross River State, Nigeria.

Dialects 
Ethnologue and Glottolog list dialects as:
 Afrike (Aferike, Utumane)
 Irungene (Mbe Afal, Mbe East, Mbube Eastern, Obe, Upper Mbe)
 Mgbenege (Ngbenege)
 Okworogung (Ukworogung)
 Ukwortung (Okorotung)
 Utugwang (Otukwang, Utukwang)

Roger Blench (2019) lists dialects as:
 Obe
 Mgbenege
 Utugwang
 Okwọrọgung
 Okwọrọtung

References

Bendi languages
Languages of Nigeria